Andrew McCann (born April 26, 1982 in Oromocto) is a Canadian curler from Fredericton Junction, New Brunswick. He currently plays lead on Team James Grattan.

Career
McCann was the alternate for Team New Brunswick skipped by James Grattan at the 2008 Tim Hortons Brier where they finished with a 2–9 record. He played in two games. He won his first provincial championship in 2012 at the 2012 Molson Canadian Men's Provincial Curling Championship as third for Terry Odishaw. At the 2012 Tim Hortons Brier, the team had a good showing, finishing the round robin in sixth with a 5–6 record. McCann would once again spare for Grattan at the 2014 Tim Hortons Brier. He played no games but the team finished with a respectable 6–5 record.

McCann joined the Grattan rink for the 2017–18 season. It was a good move for him as the team won the 2018 Papa John's Pizza Tankard, McCann's second provincial title. At the 2018 Tim Hortons Brier, they finished 2–5 in the new pool format, failing to qualify for the playoffs. They did manage to win their seeding game however, officially ending with a 3–5 record.

After a slow 2018–19 season, Team Grattan had a quick start to the 2019–20 season by winning the 2019 Jim Sullivan Curling Classic. McCann would win his third provincial title this season as well at the 2020 New Brunswick Tankard where Team Grattan stole two in the tenth end to defeat Jason Roach 8–6. They started out 1–2 at the 2020 Tim Hortons Brier but were able to upset higher seeds Ontario's John Epping and British Columbia's Steve Laycock to sit in a good spot going into their final two games. Unfortunately, they would lose both of those games, finishing the round robin at 3–4, missing the playoffs.

Due to the COVID-19 pandemic in New Brunswick, the 2021 provincial championship was cancelled. As the reigning provincial champions, Team Grattan was invited to represent New Brunswick at the 2021 Tim Hortons Brier, which they accepted. One member of Team Grattan, Paul Dobson, opted not to attend the event due to travel restrictions. He was replaced by Jonathan Beuk of Ontario. At the Brier, the Grattan rink had a strong start, defeating higher seeds Mike McEwen and Brad Jacobs to sit at 4–1 with three games left. They then, however, lost their last three games, just failing to qualify for the championship pool, like in 2020.

Personal life
McCann is married and has three children. He is the regional vice-president of sales at Salesforce.

Teams

References

External links

Curlers from New Brunswick
Living people
1982 births
Canadian male curlers
People from Sunbury County, New Brunswick